The Chatot (also Chacato or Chactoo) were a Native American tribe who lived in the upper Apalachicola River and Chipola River basins in what is now Florida. They spoke a Muskogean language, which may have been the same as that of the Pensacola people. Patricia Galloway, author of Choctaw Genesis, 1500–1700, posited that the Chatot were connected with the Choctaw. The Chatot were invovled in a war with the Apalachee and Amacano people in 1639.

The Spanish established three or four missions to the Chatot by 1675; Asunción/Asumpción del Puerto, la Encarnación (also called Santa Cruz de Sábacola el menor), San Nicolás de Tolentino (listed only in Geiger, 1940) and San Carlos de los Chacatos. These missions were located near the upper Apalachicola River. The historian John Hann places the missions of Asunción, la Encarnatión and San Carlos in the Apalachee Province of the Spanish mission system in Florida.  The historian Maynard Geiger also places Asunción in Apalachee Province, but he places la Encarnación, San Nicolás and San Carlos in the Apalachicola Province. Milanich places San Carlos de Chacatos in Apalachee Province, serving Chacatos who had moved into the province.

Notes

References

Extinct Native American peoples
Native American tribes in Florida